In statistics, Hartley's test, also known as the Fmax test or Hartley's Fmax, is used in the analysis of variance to verify that different groups have a similar variance, an assumption needed for other statistical tests. It was developed by H. O. Hartley, who published it in 1950.

The test involves computing the ratio of the largest group variance, max(sj2) to the smallest group variance, min(sj2). The resulting ratio, Fmax, is then compared to a critical value from a table of the sampling distribution of Fmax. If the computed ratio is less than the critical value, the groups are assumed to have similar or equal variances.

Hartley's test assumes that data for each group are normally distributed, and that each group has an equal number of members. This test, although convenient, is quite sensitive to violations of the normality assumption. Alternatives to Hartley's test that are robust to violations of normality are O'Brien's procedure, and the Brown–Forsythe test.

Related tests
Hartley's test is related to Cochran's C test in which the test statistic is the ratio of max(sj2) to the sum of all the group variances. Other tests related to these, have test statistics in which the within-group variances are replaced by the within-group range. Hartley's test and these similar tests, which are easy to perform but are sensitive to departures from normality, have been grouped together as quick tests for equal variances and, as such, are given a commentary by Hand & Nagaraja (2003).

See also
 Bartlett's test
 Brown–Forsythe test

Notes

References
 Bliss, C.I., Cochran, W.G., Tukey, T.W. (1956) A Rejection Criterion Based upon the Range. Biometrika, 43, 418–422.
 Cochran, W.G. (1941). The distribution of the largest of a set of estimated variances as a fraction of their total. Annals of Eugenics, 11, 47–52
 Hand, H.A. & Nagaraja, H.N. (2003) Order Statistics, 3rd Edition. Wiley. 
 Hartley, H.O. (1950). The maximum F-ratio as a short cut test for homogeneity of variance, Biometrika, 37, 308-312. 
 David, H.A. (1952). "Upper 5 and 1% points of maximum F-ratio." Biometrika, 39, 422–424.
 O'Brien, R.G. (1981). A simple test for variance effects in experimental designs. Psychological Bulletin, 89, 570–574.
 Keppel, G. and Wickens, T.D. (2004). Design and analysis (4th ed.). Englewood Cliffs, NJ: Prentice-Hall.
 Pearson, E.S., Hartley, H.O. (1970). Biometrika Tables for Statisticians, Vol 1, CUP

External links
 Table of critical values for the Fmax test 

Statistical tests
Analysis of variance